The Haystack Mountain Tower is a stone observation tower at the summit of  Haystack Mountain in Haystack Mountain State Park, Norfolk, Connecticut.  Built in 1929, it and the land on which it stands were donated by Ellen Battell Stoeckel.  It provides views of three states and Long Island Sound.  It was listed on the National Register of Historic Places in 1993.

Description and history
Haystack Mountain State Park is located just north of the village center of Norfolk, with its main access road, Stoeckel Drive, beginning on Connecticut Route 272. The road leads to the summit of Haystack Mountain, where the tower stands. The stone is randomly laid, with deeply recessed mortaring. The interior has concrete steps leading upward to intermediate lands, with wooden stairs leading from the second landing up to a metal observation platform, which is set under a conical roof. The elevation of the second landing is indicated on the exterior by a stone string course. The observation area has eight openings providing views in all directions. With clear weather, areas in New York, Massachusetts, and Connecticut are visible, with views as far south as Long Island Sound possible.

The tower was designed by Ehrick K. Rossiter of Rossiter & Muller, and is a significant local example of medieval Tudor Revival architecture.  It was built in 1929 and was listed on the National Register of Historic Places in 1993.  It cost approximately $50,000 and was donated by Mrs. Ellen Battell Stoeckel, in memory of her husband, Carl Stoeckel.  Mrs. Stoeckel's donation also included the initial tracts of land that make up the state park.

See also
National Register of Historic Places listings in Litchfield County, Connecticut

References

External links
Photo, at Haystack Mountain State Park

Towers completed in 1929
Norfolk, Connecticut
Buildings and structures in Litchfield County, Connecticut
National Register of Historic Places in Litchfield County, Connecticut
Towers in Connecticut